The Huangshan Morning Post, whose full name was Huangshan Daily - Huangshan Morning Post (黄山日报·黄山晨刊), was a Huangshan City-based Chinese-language morning newspaper published in China. The Post was founded on December 28, 2004, and officially launched on January 1, 2005.

Profile & History
The Huangshan Morning Post was a sub-publication of Huangshan Daily (黄山日报). On December 29, 2018, Huangshan Morning Post stopped publication.

References

Defunct newspapers published in China
Publications established in 2004
2004 establishments in China
Publications disestablished in 2018